Piotr Bielak (born 4 September 1976) is a Polish former footballer who is last known to have played as a midfielder for Graf-Marina Zemborzyce.

Career

Bielak played for Poland at the 1993 UEFA European Under-16 Championship, which Poland won, and the 1993 FIFA U-17 World Championship. After that, he played for a Swiss lower league side.

Before the second half of 1999/00, he signed for Hetman Zamość in the Polish lower leagues from Polish top flight club Dyskobolia Grodzisk Wielkopolski

Before the second half of 2002/03, he signed for Podbeskidzie in the Polish fourth division from Polish top flight outfit Pogoń Szczecin. After that, Bielak played for a Polish community team in the United States.

References

External links
 
 

Polish expatriate footballers
Polish expatriate sportspeople in the United States
Polish expatriate sportspeople in Switzerland
Expatriate soccer players in the United States
Expatriate footballers in Switzerland
People from Kraśnik
1976 births
Poland youth international footballers
Ekstraklasa players
Motor Lublin players
Avia Świdnik players
Podbeskidzie Bielsko-Biała players
Pogoń Szczecin players
Hetman Zamość players
KS Lublinianka players
Dyskobolia Grodzisk Wielkopolski players
Association football midfielders
Polish footballers
Living people